Moonlight Over Memphis is the third studio album by Wet Wet Wet frontman Marti Pellow. Released on October 2, 2006, the album spawned the single "Come Back Home".

Recording
Recorded at his own expense, the album saw Pellow re-unite with frequent collaborators Willie Mitchell and Chris Difford, with whom he had written the entirety of his debut album, Smile. Pellow said of the album, "As a listener, you need to commit to this record. You'll get out what you are prepared to put into it. For me, this is as good as it gets." 

The album sees Pellow return to his soul roots, drawing comparisons to the Wets' 1988 release The Memphis Sessions, which was also produced by Mitchell.

Promotion
"Come Back Home" was released as the lead and only single from the album, being promoted with a performance on Loose Women shortly before the album's release.

"Let the Sun Walk You Home" has since become the most recognisable track from the album, becoming a regular staple of Marti's live sets, being performed on every tour, up to and including his most recent Greatest Hits Tour, which ran from Sept 2021 until May 2022.

Track listing

References

2006 albums
Marti Pellow albums
Albums produced by Willie Mitchell (musician)
Demon Music Group albums